Andrej Dugolin (born 19 September 1986) is a Slovenian footballer who plays as a midfielder for FC Bad Radkersburg. His first club was Aluminij.

References

External links
NZS profile 

1986 births
Living people
People from Ptuj
Slovenian footballers
Association football midfielders
NK Aluminij players
NK Olimpija Ljubljana (2005) players
NK Drava Ptuj players
NK Zavrč players
Slovenian Second League players
Slovenian PrvaLiga players
Slovenian expatriate footballers
Slovenian expatriate sportspeople in Austria
Expatriate footballers in Austria